Gaspar Polanco Borbón (1816 – 28 November 1867) was a Dominican military general and politician. He has been one of the most notable military figures in the history of the Dominican Republic and served as the country's president.

In August 1863 he already held the rank of general, and assumed as Commander-in-Chief.

Early life
Son of Valentín Polanco (1790-), a wealthy hatero from Santiago de los Caballeros who owned cattle and tobacco farms and lived in Monte Cristi, and Martina de Borbón. Despite coming from a distinguished bourgeois family, he did not attend school as a child and could not read or write, although he did sign his name. His older brother, Juan Antonio Polanco, was also a brigadier general in the Restoration War and one of its main organizers. His sister, Rita Polanco Borbón, was the wife of restaurateur Federico de Jesús García. His niece Ana Polanco, daughter of Juan Antonio, was the wife of Federico and 9th president of the Dominican Republic Pedro Antonio Pimentel.

Polanco Borbón married Maria Ortega in Santiago de los Caballeros, later settling in Cañeo, Esperanza in the province of Valverde, where his four sons grew up: Tomás, Francisco, Manuel and José Mauricio, who dedicated themselves to agricultural activities in the estates of the family in Valverde and Navarrete.

Military career
In 1844, he participated in the Dominican War of Independence, with the rank of colonel, standing out in the Battle of Talanquera and the Battle of March 30. He excelled in the Northwest Line military campaigns with troops from rural areas. In 1848, he was promoted to captain and assigned to the Northwest Line Cavalry units, participating during that year and 1849, in actions of siege, harassment and attacks by the Haitian forces stationed in the region along the Maguaca River.

By then, Polanco had gained fame as a vanguard soldier, an expert connoisseur of the terrain of the region and would always be the leader of scouts and vanguard. With the rank of lieutenant colonel and vanguard chief, he stood out in the Battles of Sabana Larga and Jácuba, for which at the same time he was promoted to brigadier general. In 1858, he  occupied the military headquarters of the La Peñuela Section.

Revolution of 1857

Buenaventura Báez was considered by Polanco and his men as an enemy of the interests of Cibao, since he caused the ruin of the cigar makers and a serious economic crisis. In July 1857, General Polanco led a revolution together with Generals Domingo Mallol and Juan Luis Franco Bido that established a parallel government with José Desiderio Valverde as president, based in Santiago. The capital, Santo Domingo, was besieged from July 31, 1857, to June 13, 1858.

Period of annexation of Spain

As Brigadier General of the Cavalry and the Military Reserves in the Northwest Line, Polanco was initially at the service of Spain when the Annexation was consummated, which he supported, convinced by Pedro Santana. In these functions, under the orders of General José Antonio Hungary, Lieutenant Governor in the northern region, he led the Spanish forces that persecuted the patriots restaurateurs, among whom was his older brother Juan Antonio Polanco, who in February 1863, tried to start the war against Spain.

Restoration War

As of August 16, the Spanish brigadier Manuel Buceta and the Spaniards are pursued from Capotillo through the entire Northwest Line by Pedro Pimentel, his brother Juan Antonio Polanco, and Benito Monción. The audacious and experienced warrior stands by their side and arrives with them on the outskirts of the city of Santiago, which has begun to be besieged by thousands of men.

He was proclaimed Commander in Chief of the restorative forces, by all the revolutionary leaders of the region. He was accepted for his conditions as a courageous and competent warrior, for having been the only general of the Independence campaigns who had taken part in the movement up to that moment, for his social weight, his prestige and his authority.

Presidency
Polanco's dedication to the restorative cause was unquestionable. He did not approve of the vacillating attitude towards the Spanish authorities of the government headed by José Antonio Salcedo (Pepillo), who had proclaimed himself President of the Republic without the approval of the majority of restaurateurs. The restorative revolution had lost its dynamism due to the negligent attitudes and suspicious movements of President Salcedo. Influenced by his brother Juan Antonio, who was enlightened, he led the rebellion against Salcedo and led to his overthrow on October 10, 1864.

After overthrowing Salcedo from the presidency, he was president of the Republic in arms from October 10, 1864, to January 24, 1865. During his government, Polanco took some very positive measures for the country both in economic terms as educational. Ulises Francisco Espaillat was his vice-president, and his cabinet included the restorers Máximo Grullón Salcedo and Silverio Delmonte on the Interior and Police Commission; and the restorer and poet Manuel Rodríguez Objío in the Foreign Relations Commission.

He ordered Gregorio Luperón to exile former President Salcedo to Haiti, but the Haitian authorities did not accept him. In order not to risk the success of the restoration and due to Salcedo's intentions to sponsor the return of the annexationist leader Buenaventura Báez, Polanco, with the approval of the other restorers, ordered the execution of Salcedo. Despite the overwhelming success of the restorative feat, his action against Salcedo overshadowed the glory of Polanco Borbón in certain ruling circles.

Death

He was overthrown from the presidency by a movement that his brother Juan Antonio supported led by Pimentel, Monción and García, who considered his attempt to monopolize tobacco with his friends and associates as an arbitrary and dictatorial decision, and he went on to dedicate himself to their herds and agricultural activities where he lived in Esperanza, Valverde.

After the Republic was restored, Polanco participated in various revolutionary movements, like all those of his time, for a simple replacement of the Government. In an armed action in 1867 in defense of the government of Gral. José María Cabral, the first president elected by universal suffrage, he was wounded in the foot. He was taken to receive medical attention in Santiago and then transferred to the city of La Vega, where he died of tetanus, as a result of the wound received. His older brother Juan Antonio continued the anti-annexation struggle against Buenaventura Baez, leading at the end of 1873 a military rebellion in Monte Cristi together with Ulises Heureaux which, although it was put down, marked the beginning of the end of his six-year rule10.

His remains rest in the National Pantheon of the Dominican Republic in Santo Domingo.

References

1816 births
1867 deaths
19th-century Dominican Republic people
Presidents of the Dominican Republic
People of the Dominican War of Independence
People of the Dominican Restoration War
19th-century military personnel
19th-century politicians
People from Monte Cristi Province
Generals
Dominican Republic people of Spanish descent